The National Roads Institute (INVÍAS) is an agency of the Executive Branch of the Government of Colombia in charge of allocating, regulating and supervising contracts for highway and roads construction and maintenance.

References

Government agencies established in 1994
Ministry of Transport (Colombia)
Roads in Colombia
Highways in Colombia